Pakwash Provincial Park is a park in Northwestern Ontario, on the eastern shore of Pakwash Lake.

Classified as a natural environment park, it offers camping and day use, including canoeing, fishing and swimming area from mid-May to mid-September. The park is reached by Ontario Highway 105 north from Vermillion Bay, Ontario.

References

External links

Provincial parks of Ontario
Parks in Kenora District
Protected areas established in 1967
1967 establishments in Ontario